Mae Peshlakai is an American politician and a Navajo elder, jewelry maker, and weaver. She is a Democratic member of the Arizona House of Representatives elected to represent District 6 in 2022.

She is the mother of former State Senator Jamescita Peshlakai. She speaks English and Navajo.

References

External links 

 Biography at Ballotpedia

Democratic Party members of the Arizona House of Representatives
Living people
Year of birth missing (living people)
21st-century American women politicians
Women state legislators in Arizona
21st-century American politicians
Navajo leaders
Native American state legislators in Arizona
Native American women in politics
Native American jewelers
American weavers
Native American textile artists
People from Coconino County, Arizona